The Federal Reserve Bank of Atlanta New Orleans Branch Office is one of the five Federal Reserve Bank of Atlanta branch offices. The New Orleans branch is part of the 6th District. This branch also has a dedicated hurricane Katrina staff.

The New Orleans Branch is home to the Museum of Trade, Finance, and the Fed. which was established in 2013 and is open to self-guided tours (admission free). Previously guided tours were available by appointment.  The tour is very brief and is limited to three small exhibits on the first floor, and takes less than 30 minutes. A further feature is the opportunity to make one's own currency with a person's picture on it and have it emailed to them.

See also

 Federal Reserve Act
 Federal Reserve System
 Federal Reserve Bank
 Federal Reserve Districts
 Federal Reserve Branches
 Federal Reserve Bank of Atlanta
 Federal Reserve Bank of Atlanta Birmingham Branch Office
 Federal Reserve Bank of Atlanta Jacksonville Branch Office
 Federal Reserve Bank of Atlanta Miami Branch Office
 Federal Reserve Bank of Atlanta Nashville Branch Office

References

External links

Federal Reserve Bank of Atlanta New Orleans Branch Office

Federal Reserve branches